The Telus Cup is Canada's national under-18 ice hockey club championship. It is an annual event, held by Hockey Canada each April. From 1979 to 2003, the national championship was sponsored by Air Canada.

The current champions are the Moncton Flyers who won the 2022 Telus Cup.

History

Wrigley Cup (1973–1978)
The forerunner to the Canadian national under-18 championship was the Wrigley National Midget Hockey Tournament, which ran from 1974 though 1978. Canadian Amateur Hockey Association president Jack Devine announced the sanction of the new national midget hockey tournament for the top 12 teams in the country, with the Wrigley Company being the initial sponsor. Gord Renwick organized the first event in 1974, and served as the tournament chairman. The 1974 Wrigley Cup was scheduled at the Oshawa Civic Auditorium, with the winning team would earn a trip to the Soviet Union, and future events would be rotated around Canada.

In 1973, prior to Wrigley, the Prince Edward Island provincial government co-sponsored it as part of their "Come Home Year" celebrations. The Wrigley was an invitational event, with each of Canadian Hockey's branches declaring their respective champions through playdowns held during the Christmas and New Year's holidays. The champions were invited to take part in the Wrigley each January, a host team comprised the final competitor.

Each year, the winning team represented Canada in the Soviet Union for a series of games against elite teams, including the Soviet Midget Red Army in Moscow, Leningrad, and Riga. The Verdun Midget Maple Leafs won the first Wrigley championship in 1974, defeating Kingston Gurnsey Realtors of Ontario 5–3. The final game was televised live coast-to-coast by the CTV Television Network. Media in USSR reported that the last game between the Leafs and the Red Army team in Moscow was viewed by more than 100 million people on Soviet television, although there were only two television channels in Russia at that time. Verdun lost to the National Russian Team, 6–5.

Air Canada Cup (1979–2003)
Canada's official national under-18 championship, the Air Canada Cup, was established in 1979. The inaugural tournament was held in Winnipeg, Manitoba and used a format similar to the Wrigley. Each of Canada's twelve branches determined their champions through their own playoff system. The branch champions advanced to the national tournament to play for the Air Canada Cup.

In 1984, the Air Canada Cup was revised to the current six-team format. Five regional champions, decided by inter-branch competition (except for Québec), and a predetermined host team play a round-robin with the top four teams qualifying for the playoff round. A total of 19 games are played over six days of competition.

Telus Cup (2004–present)
After Air Canada's sponsorship ended in 2003, Telus Communications Inc, a subsidiary of Telus Corporation signed on as the new title sponsor and the national championship was rechristened as the Telus Cup in October 2004.

Teams from Saskatchewan and Quebec have been dominant at this event and have captured the most medals. The most successful teams include the Notre Dame Hounds, Regina Pat Canadians, Prince Albert Mintos, Lac St-Louis Lions, Richelieu Riverains (now Collège Charles-Lemoyne), and Red Deer Rebels/Chiefs.

Each year's gold medal game is televised nationally on TSN (English) and RDS (French).

Winners and hosts

Notes

National championships by region

''Note: Wins by host teams and teams prior to regional consolidation have been assigned to their respective regions as they currently exist.

References

External links
Telus Cup website

 
Ice hockey tournaments in Canada
Canadian ice hockey trophies and awards
Hockey Canada